Leppänen is a Finnish surname. Notable people with the surname include:

 Antti Leppänen (born 1947), Finnish ice hockey player
 Glory Leppänen (1901-1979), Finnish actress, director and writer
 Kaisu Leppänen (1904–1993), Finnish actress
 Kari Leppänen (born 1945), Finnish comic strip artist
 Reijo Leppänen (born 1951), Finnish ice hockey player
 Sulo Leppänen (born 1916), Finnish wrestler

Finnish-language surnames